Diaxenes phalaenopsidis is a species of beetle in the family Cerambycidae. It was described by Fisher in 1937.

References

Apomecynini
Beetles described in 1937